Union of Communists of Kurdistan (in Kurdish: Yekîtîya Komunîstên Kurdistan) was an illegal Kurdish communist organization in Turkey. YKK was formed in 1986 through a split from the Communist Party of Turkey/Unity (TKP/B).

YKK existed until the early 1990s., 
Communist organizations in Turkey